Carl Kaufmann (25 March 1936 – 1 September 2008) was an American born West German sprint runner.

Kaufmann initially specialized in the 200 m, but in 1958 changed to 400 m and won a European silver medal in the 4×400 m relay. Between 15 September 1959 and 6 September 1960 he set four European records in 400 metres, reducing the time down to 44.9 s, which remained the record until the 1968 Summer Olympics in Mexico City.

He competed for the United Team of Germany at the 1960 Summer Olympics in the 400 metres and won the silver. The finish line picture of Kaufmann's desperate lunge to try to capture the gold has been shown in many track and field publications. Both Kaufmann and Davis set a new world-record time at 44.9 s and became the first athletes to run the 400 m with 45 seconds. Kaufmann then joined team mates Joachim Reske, Manfred Kinder and Johannes Kaiser in the 4×400 m relay, where they won the silver medal.

After retiring from competitions Kaufmann was running an amateur theatre in Karlsruhe, where he died aged 72.

References

External links

 

1936 births
2008 deaths
German male sprinters
Olympic silver medalists for the United Team of Germany
Olympic silver medalists in athletics (track and field)
Olympic athletes of the United Team of Germany
Athletes (track and field) at the 1960 Summer Olympics
Medalists at the 1960 Summer Olympics
European Athletics Championships medalists
Recipients of the Cross of the Order of Merit of the Federal Republic of Germany
Sportspeople from Brooklyn
Track and field athletes from New York City